Kırıkkale station is the main railway station in Kırıkkale, Turkey. The station was originally opened on 20 November 1925 by the Anatolian—Baghdad Railways and was one of the first railway stations built by the newly formed Republic of Turkey.

TCDD Taşımacılık operates three daily intercity trains from Ankara to Kars, Kurtalan, and Tatvan, A twice daily regional train from Ankara to Kırıkkale has been suspended since 2016, due to the closure of the railway from Ankara station to Kayaş, to rehabilitate the line for the new Başkentray commuter rail system. Once construction is complete by December 2017, Ankara-Kırıkkale Regional train service is expected to resume.

References

External links
Kırıkkale station timetable
Kırıkkale station timetable

Railway stations in Kırıkkale Province
Railway stations opened in 1925
1925 establishments in Turkey